Jedsadakorn Kowngam (born 13 March 1997) is a Thai professional footballer who plays as an attacking midfielder and forward for Thai League 1 club Lamphun Warrior.

International Goals

U23

Honours

International
Thailand U-23
 2019 AFF U-22 Youth Championship: Runner up

Club
Nongbua Pitchaya
 Thai League 2 Champions : 2020–21

References

External links
Jedsadakorn Kowngam at soccerway.com

1997 births
Living people
Jedsadakorn Kowngam
Jedsadakorn Kowngam
Association football midfielders
Jedsadakorn Kowngam
Jedsadakorn Kowngam
Jedsadakorn Kowngam
Jedsadakorn Kowngam
Jedsadakorn Kowngam